John Tytler may refer to:
 John Tytler (VC)
 John Tytler (surgeon)

See also
 John Tyler (disambiguation)